Vegar is both a surname and a masculine Norwegian given name. It may refer to:

Surname:
José Luis Vegar (born 1975), Spanish footballer
Tino Vegar (born 1967), Croatian water polo player

Given name:
Vegar Barlie (born 1972), Norwegian ice hockey player
Vegar Eggen Hedenstad (born 1991), Norwegian footballer
Vegar Gjermundstad (born 1990), Norwegian footballer
Vegar Landro (born 1983), Norwegian footballer
Bård Vegar Solhjell (born 1971), Norwegian politician

See also
Vegår, lake in Norway
Vegard

Norwegian masculine given names